Eleva may refer to:

 Eleva Electric Mobility, an Indian electric vehicle and clean energy company based in New Delhi, India.
Eleva, Wisconsin, the USA village 
 Eleva (insect), a genus of crickets in the tribe Landrevini.
 Sertraline, a brand name of a medication that is also known as Zoloft